HMS Express was the American merchant vessel Achilles, launched in 1809 in America. Her owners in 1813 renamed her 
Anna Maria. In 1814 she served the British Royal Navy in North American waters as an advice boat. In 1815 the Royal Navy commissioned her as HMS Express, a ship's tender serving in the Mediterranean. In 1816 she was at the bombardment of Algiers. The Navy sold her at Malta in 1827.

HMS Anna Maria
It is not clear when the Royal Navy captured Anna Maria. On 27 November 1813  captured the "Sloop Anna Maria, of 7 men and 60 tons, from Philadelphia, bound to New York". This is the most likely candidate from among the several Anna Marias whose capture was announced in the London Gazette.

Anna Maria participated in the expedition up the Potomac (August–September 1814).

Later Euryalus contributed a boat armed with a howitzer to assist Meteor, Anna Maria, and a gunboat taken in prize in their unsuccessful attempt to stop the Americans from adding guns to a battery that would impede the British withdrawal. In 1847 the Admiralty awarded the Naval General Service Medal (NGSM) with clasp "The Potomac 17 Augt. 1814" to all surviving claimants from the campaign; the listing of the vessels qualifying gives the name of Anna Marias commander as "Jackson".

Anna Maria also shared in the prize money for the schooner Mary and the goods from the transports Lloyd and Abeona, captured in the Chesapeake between 29 November and 19 December 1814.

HMS Express
The Admiralty purchased Anna Maria in May of 1815. She was then commissioned in June as HMS Express under the command of Lieutenant E. Garrett. Thereafter she served in the Mediterranean as a tender.

Express was at the bombardment of Algiers on 27 August 1816.

From March to July 1824 she was at the blockade of Algiers. Lloyd's List reported that on 29 February, The Express Ship of War, one of the English Squadron blockading Algiers, arrived at Marseilles. Gordon left Express on 27 June 1826, on his promotion to Lieutenant.

Fate
The Royal Navy sold Express on 26 July 1827 at Malta.

Notes, citations and references
Notes

Citations

References
 
 
 
 

1809 ships
Captured ships
Schooners of the Royal Navy